Brześć Voivodeship or Brest Voivodeship may refer to:
 Brest Litovsk Voivodeship (Brześć Litewski Voivodeship)
 Brześć Kujawski Voivodeship
 Brześć Voivodeship (1793)